This is a list of miniatures and supplements for HeroClix, a collectible miniatures game using the Clix system and revolving around the world of superhero comic books and related media. Most prominently, the game features miniatures representing characters from Marvel Comics and DC Comics, though numerous other franchises are represented as well such as Teenage Mutant Ninja Turtles, Street Fighter, Gears of War, and Halo.

Main series

Non-superhero series

Expansions

Limited release figures

Limited release figures

"Buy it By the Brick" figures

Large figures 
Typically, HeroClix's large figures were only sold at promotional events such as conventions. These were typically four times the size of normal figures, though larger ones also existed.

Storyline Organized Play 
These were promotional efforts held by WizKids focusing on month-long tournaments that played out like various iconic comic book storylines. Coinciding with these were unique figures as participation and/or monthly prizes.

Footnotes

References 

Collectible miniatures games
Games based on comics
Clix (miniatures) games
Marvel Comics games
DC Comics games
WizKids games